George Torrance may refer to:

 George William Torrance (1835–1907), Irish composer in Australia
 George Torrance (footballer) (born 1957), Scottish footballer